Municipal elections were held in the Canadian province of New Brunswick on May 9, 2016. Here is a summary of the mayoral results in the major communities in the province and the council results for the three largest cities.

Bathurst

Beaubassin East

Campbellton

Dieppe

Edmundston

Fredericton

 Fredericton City Council

Grand Bay–Westfield

Grand Falls

Miramichi

November 16, 2016 mayoral by-election

Moncton

Moncton City Council

November 16, 2016 Ward 4 by-election

Oromocto

Plebiscite

Quispamsis

Riverview

Rothesay

Sackville

Saint John

Saint John City Council

May 6, 2019 Ward 3 by-election

Shediac

Tracadie

Woodstock

References

Elections NB - Quadrennial Election Contests

Municipal elections in New Brunswick
2016 elections in Canada
2016 in New Brunswick